Ceraria namaquensis, with the common names Namaqua porkbush and Namaqua portulacaria, is a species of succulent shrub, native to the border between South Africa and Namibia.

The plant's current name is Portulacaria namaquensis, due to recent phylogenetic studies have shown that it is in fact located within the genus Portulacaria.

Its closest relative is the species Portulacaria armiana

Distribution
The natural habitat of this species extends along the Orange River valley, along the border between Namibia and South Africa. It has also been recorded near the coast slightly further north in Namibia.

This is an extremely arid, winter-rainfall area. In cultivation, it requires extremely well-drained soil, and is usually grown grafted onto a root-stock of the more resilient Portulacaria afra.

Description

It reaches heights of 1.3 to 1.8 meters, and typically has small, ovoid, club-shaped leaves.

These succulent leaves are deciduous, and densely coat its stems. The stems are stout and grow upwards, forking. They are very slow-growing. Its flowers are usually unisexual.

References

External links
 Hortipedia entry for Ceraria namaquensis

Didiereaceae
namaquensis
Flora of Namibia
Flora of South Africa
Garden plants of Africa